Nenad Filipović (Serbian Cyrillic: Ненад Филиповић; born 24 April 1987 in Titovo Užice) is a Serbian footballer who plays as a goalkeeper for TSC Bačka Topola.

Career
On 14 April 2013, Filipović was dismissed circa 20 seconds after the start of Etar's match against CSKA Sofia for fouling an opponent and denying a goal scoring opportunity. He likely holds the record for the fastest sending off in A PFG's history.

Personal life
Filipović's sister is married to Milan Borjan, also a professional footballer who plays as a goalkeeper for Red Star Belgrade and the Canada national team.

References

External links
 Nenad Filipović at HLSZ
 Nenad Filipović at Utakmica
 Nenad Filipović at Srbijafudbal

1987 births
Living people
Sportspeople from Užice
Serbian footballers
Association football goalkeepers
FK Banat Zrenjanin players
FK Rad players
FK Teleoptik players
FK Radnički Niš players
FK Mačva Šabac players
Serbian SuperLiga players
Fehérvár FC players
MTK Budapest FC players
Nemzeti Bajnokság I players
FC Etar 1924 Veliko Tarnovo players
First Professional Football League (Bulgaria) players
Serbian expatriate footballers
Expatriate footballers in Hungary
Serbian expatriate sportspeople in Hungary
Expatriate footballers in Bulgaria
Serbian expatriate sportspeople in Bulgaria